Ministry of Foreign Affairs is the foreign affairs ministry of Cyprus. It is headquartered in Nicosia.

See also
 Foreign relations of Cyprus
 List of Ministers of Foreign Affairs of Cyprus

References

External links
  Ministry of Foreign Affairs (Cyprus)
 Ministry of Foreign Affairs 

Cyprus
Government of Cyprus